"Mayonaise" is a song by American alternative rock band the Smashing Pumpkins, first released on their 1993 album Siamese Dream.

Composition
It was written by James Iha and Billy Corgan and was recorded from December 1992 to March 1993 at Triclops Sound Studios. According to Corgan, the whistling sound (feedback) heard in "Mayonaise" came from a cheap guitar he bought, which, whenever he stopped playing it, created the whistling sound. This sound was then incorporated into the song. Corgan apparently got the title for the song after he looked "in [his] refrigerator". Later, he stated in an interview with a Colombian radio station that the name stands for the phonetics of 'My Own Eyes'.

Iha stated that he "...came up with those chords and did a demo of it, it was an instrumental demo of the song. I played it for Billy and he liked it, he came up with the vocal melody and the lyrics. We worked on the arrangement together."

While appearing on the podcast REINVENTED with Jen Eckhart on 20 October 2022, Billy Corgan admitted that previous explanations for the song title were inside jokes and disclosed the true story. The band visited Japan in 1992 while touring Gish and noticed that the record company had mistranslated a lyric from Gish into a fan booklet as "mayonnaise seas". The band thought this was funny and used "Mayonaise"  as a temporary song title when recording Siamese Dream but it eventually stuck.

Versions
Several versions of the song are available. Before being officially released on Siamese Dream, an acoustic mix (labeled as an outtake) of the Siamese Dream recording was featured on the Mashed Potatoes box set given to friends of the band in 1993-1994. It was also a part of the official promos Still Becoming Apart and The Smashing Pumpkins 1991–1998, with a slightly phased acoustic guitar part and a tambourine. Most recently, a live acoustic version was released on Earphoria and the Vieuphoria video. The Vieuphoria version, originally broadcast in 1993 on the British television show Naked City, features the band playing the song intertwined with footage of the band.

On a 2007 Smashing Pumpkins tribute album compiled by MySpace and Spin, the song was covered by American rock band The Academy Is...

The band Emanuel also covered the song on the 2005 Smashing Pumpkins tribute album The Killer in You: A Tribute to Smashing Pumpkins.

Reception
Despite having garnered considerable radio play and remaining a fan favorite, "Mayonaise" was never an officially released single. In 2012 it won a Rolling Stone readers poll for "The Best Smashing Pumpkins Songs" by "a significant margin".

References

The Smashing Pumpkins songs
1993 songs
Songs written by Billy Corgan
Songs written by James Iha
Song recordings produced by Billy Corgan
Song recordings produced by Butch Vig
Shoegaze songs